Noel Keresztes (born 16 September 2004) is a Hungarian professional footballer who plays for Budapest Honvéd.

Career statistics
.

References

2004 births
Living people
People from Pécs
Hungarian footballers
Hungary youth international footballers
Association football midfielders
Budapest Honvéd FC players
BFC Siófok players
Nemzeti Bajnokság I players
Nemzeti Bajnokság II players
Nemzeti Bajnokság III players